The 2017–18 Austin Peay Governors men's basketball team represented Austin Peay State University during the 2017–18 NCAA Division I men's basketball season. The Governors, led by first-year head coach Matt Figger, played their home games at the Dunn Center in Clarksville, Tennessee as members of the  Ohio Valley Conference. They finished the season 19–15, 12–6 in OVC play to finish in third place. They defeated Eastern Illinois in the quarterfinals of the OVC tournament before losing in the semifinals to Belmont. They were invited to the CollegeInsider.com Tournament where they defeated Louisiana–Monroe in the first round, a game referred to as the Coach John McLendon Classic, and received a second round bye before losing in the quarterfinals to UIC.

Previous season 
The Governors finished the 2016–17 season 11–19, 7–9 in OVC play to finish in fourth place in the West Division. They failed to qualify for the Ohio Valley Conference tournament.

On March 2, 2017, head coach Dave Loos announced his retirement. He had been undergoing cancer treatment during the season, and had taken a medical leave in January 2017, missing four games. He finished with a 27 year record of 420–410. On April 3, South Carolina assistant Matt Figger was hired as the new head coach of APSU.

Preseason 
In a vote of conference coaches and sports information directors, Austin Peay was picked to finish in 11th place in the OVC.

After five years of divisional play in the OVC, the conference eliminated divisions for the 2017–18 season. Additionally, for the first time, each conference team will play 18 conference games.

Roster

Schedule and results

|-
!colspan=9 style=| Exhibition

|-
!colspan=9 style=| Non-conference regular Season

|-
!colspan=9 style=| Ohio Valley Conference regular season

|-
!colspan=9 style="|Ohio Valley Conference tournament

|-
!colspan=9 style="|CIT

References

Austin Peay Governors men's basketball seasons
Austin Peay
Austin Peay
Austin Peay
Austin Peay